Neoshirakia, known as milktree, is a genus of plants in the Euphorbiaceae, native to east Asia. It is part of a group first described in 1954 with the name Shirakia, but this proved to be an illegitimate name, unacceptable under the Code of Nomenclature. The genus was later divided, with its species distributed amongst three genera: Neoshirakia, Shirakiopsis , and Triadica. Neoshirakia contains only one known species, Neoshirakia japonica, known as tallow tree, native to China, Korea, and Japan (including Nansei-shotō). The name Shirakia thus became a synonym of Neoshirakia because S. japonica was the type species for that genus, the species now renamed N. japonica.

References

Hippomaneae
Flora of China
Flora of Eastern Asia
Monotypic Euphorbiaceae genera